Jan Ruiter (born 24 November 1946 in Enkhuizen, North Holland) is a former Dutch football goalkeeper.

Career
During his club career he played for FC Volendam, R.S.C. Anderlecht, R.W.D. Molenbeek, K. Beerschot V.A.C. and Royal Antwerp FC. He earned 1 cap for the Netherlands national football team, and was included in their squad for the 1976 UEFA European Football Championship. While at Anderlecht he played as they won the 1976 European Cup Winners' Cup Final.

He later managed Berchem.

Honours

Player

FC Volendam 

 Eerste Divisie: 1969-70

 
 RSC Anderlecht

 Belgian First Division: 1971–72, 1973–74
 Belgian Cup: 1971–72, 1972–73, 1974–75, 1975–76
 Belgian League Cup: 1973, 1974
 European Cup Winners' Cup: 1975–76 (winners), 1976-77 (runners-up)
 European Super Cup: 1976
 Amsterdam Tournament: 1976
 Jules Pappaert Cup: 1977
 Belgian Sports Merit Award: 1978

References

External links

  Profile
 Antwerp stats – FC Antwerp

1946 births
Living people
Association football goalkeepers
Dutch footballers
Dutch expatriate footballers
Netherlands international footballers
UEFA Euro 1976 players
Eredivisie players
Eerste Divisie players
Belgian Pro League players
FC Volendam players
R.S.C. Anderlecht players
R.W.D. Molenbeek players
K. Beerschot V.A.C. players
Royal Antwerp F.C. players
People from Enkhuizen
Expatriate footballers in Belgium
Dutch expatriate sportspeople in Belgium
Dutch football managers
K. Berchem Sport managers
Sportspeople from North Holland